The Bologna Guild of Silk Weavers (Hebrew: בעלי ברית עושי מלאכת המשי) were a Guild of Jewish Silk weavers in Bologna during the 1530s and 1540s.

Hebrew Printing Activities 

Bologna Jewry has had a history of Jewish guild owners, including Abraham Dei Tintori, a dyer who printed the first Hebrew bible in Bologna in 1482(the first Hebrew book to be printed there was likely in 1477, an editio princeps of David Kimchi's work. This book was the first Hebrew Pentateuch with nikkud, with the commentaries of Rashi and Targum.

The Bologna Guild of Silk Weavers operated a Printing press with which they issued nine editions of Hebrew books between the years 1537-1540. Among these volumes were important liturgies, including a deluxe edition of the Machzor by Elijah ben Menahem HaZaken of Le Mans in 1537. In 2018, a Special edition on vellum of this printing (formerly from the collection of Salman Schocken) was offered for sale at Sotheby's in New York. Other important sales included a painted edition of the prayer book on vellum from the Valmadonna Trust Library sale.

Other important works printed by the Guild of Silk Weavers included the books by important Italian rabbis Menahem Recanati and Obadia ben Jacob Sforno, who was a resident in Bologna at the time of the Hebrew printing of his work on religious philosophy (called Or 'amim, "Light for the Nations"). 

Another book printed by the Guild of Silk Weavers in 1538 was "Torah or" by Joseph ibn Yaḥya ben David on the subjects of Paradise and Hell, which features the first printed image of the Menorah (Temple); the image is created from small printed words as a Micrographic image. The designer (presumably an artist in the guild) put the Menorah on a pedestal and not a marble base, as is shown on the Arch of Titus.

Hebrew printed books from Bologna are very rare today, especially on the rare book market.

References 

1530s establishments
Guild of Silk Weavers
Guild of Silk Weavers
Guilds in Italy
Silk production
Defunct Jewish organizations
Jewish organizations based in Italy